Gordon A. "Gord" Turlick (born September 13, 1939) is a Canadian former professional ice hockey player who played two games in the National Hockey League with the Boston Bruins during the 1959–60 season. The rest of his career, which lasted from 1960 to 1972, was spent in various minor leagues.

Career statistics

Regular season and playoffs

External links
 

1939 births
Living people
Boston Bruins players
Canadian expatriate ice hockey players in the United States
Canadian ice hockey left wingers
Clinton Comets players
Ice hockey people from British Columbia
Indianapolis Chiefs players
Kimberley Dynamiters players
Melville Millionaires players
New York Rovers players
Prince Albert Mintos players
Spokane Jets players
Sudbury Wolves (EPHL) players